The Terrorist is an Indian Tamil film directed by Santosh Sivan. The film portrays a period in the life of a 19-year-old woman, Malli (Ayesha Dharker), sent to assassinate a leader in South Asia through a suicide bombing. It stars Dharker, K. Krishna and Sonu Sisupal. Released in 1998, the film was shot in 15 days, with natural lighting, on a shoestring budget of ₹25 lakh (worth ₹2.2 crore in 2021 prices).

The film won a number of awards at international film festivals. Actor John Malkovich first saw the film at the 1998 Cairo International Film Festival and subsequently adopted the film as a kind of post-facto executive producer (the reissued film's titles read "John Malkovich Presents"). Critic Roger Ebert has included the film in his series of "Great Movies" reviews. Ebert concludes his review with the following line: "Every time I see the film, I feel a great sadness, that a human imagination could be so limited that it sees its own extinction as a victory."
The film that proved his mastery over the visual language was The Terrorist which has become a textbook of sorts for visual communication students, with scenes from the movie being used by Michael Chapman, Martin Scorsese’s cinematographer, to explain the tenets of cinematography during workshops. According to film critic Roger Ebert, it was a film ‘scripted by the camera’. Says Sivan: "One day I got a call from Samuel Lee Jackson who was interested to cast the heroine of The Terrorist, Ayesha, in a Hollywood film."

Plot 
The movie focuses on a 19-year-old woman named Malli (based on Kalaivani Rajaratnam), who joined a terrorist organization at a very young age after her brother was killed in the cause. She eventually volunteers herself to become a suicide bomber in an assassination mission.  As the plot moves forward, she discovers the importance of human life, after realizing she is pregnant.  This causes Malli to question her determination to complete the mission.

Cast 
 Ayesha Dharker as Malli
 Vishnu Vardhan as Thyagu
 Bhanu Prakash as Perumal
 K. Krishna as Lover
 Sonu Sisupal as Leader
 Anuradha

Inspiration 
On 21 May 1991, Rajiv Gandhi was campaigning in favour of a UCPI candidate for the upcoming parliamentary elections in Tamil Nadu, when he was assassinated by a suicide bomber in the Indian town of Sriperumbudur, near Madras.

The suicide bomber, Kalaivani Rajaratnam (popularly known by her assumed name Thenmozhi Rajaratnam and Dhanu), is widely believed to have been a LTTE member. Kalaivani was a cousin of Shivarasan, the supposed mastermind of the assassination. Kalaivani wore the belt bomb with the explosive material in her lower back region and the power pack, two switches and the circuitry in front.

When Santosh Sivan, a well-known cinematographer, wanted to make a film on terrorism and about a terrorist, he chose the above events as the inspiration for his story.

The film is not a direct biography of Kalaivani Rajaratnam, as she had a whole troupe working with her, as backup in case she failed. Also, she was not pregnant at the time of the assassination of Rajiv Gandhi.

Awards 
Won
1998 - National Film Award for Best Feature Film in Tamil - The Terrorist
1998 - National Film Award for Best Editing - The Terrorist
1998 - Cairo International Film Festival- Best Director - Santosh Sivan
1998 - Cairo International Film Festival- Golden Pyramid For Best film - The Terrorist
1998 - Cairo International Film Festival- Best Artistic Contribution by an Actress - Ayesha Dharker
1998 - Sundance Film Festival - Best Film - The Terrorist
1998 - Toronto International Film Festival - Emerging Master - Santosh Sivan
1999 - Cinemanila International Film Festival - Grand Jury Prize - Santosh Sivan
1999 - Cinemanila International Film Festival - Lino Brocka Award for Best Film - Santosh Sivan
2000 - Ale Kino International Young Audience Film Festival - Poznan Goat for Best Director - Santosh Sivan
2000 - Sarajevo Film Festival - Panorama Jury Prize for Honorable Mention - Santosh Sivan

Nominated
1998 - National Film Award for Best Actress - Best Actress - Ayesha Dharker
2001 - Phoenix Film Critics Society Award for Best Foreign Language Film

Further reading 
 Dying to Win: The Strategic Logic of Suicide Terrorism by Robert Pape, Random House (24 May 2005), 
 https://www.imdb.com/title/tt0169302/plotsummary
 Thompson, Kristin, and David Bordwell. Film History, An Introduction. New York: McGraw-Hill Humanities/Social Sciences/Languages, 2010. 624. Print.

See also 
 Rajiv Gandhi assassination in popular culture

Footnotes
 http://apm.asianfilmmarket.org/eng/database/view_ppp_history.asp?order_year=2007&idx=256&no=4
 http://www.santoshsivan.com/html/eng_john.htm
 A.O., Scott. "The Terrorist (1998)" New York Times. (2011)
 The Terrorist full credits at IMDb, 
 Thompson, Kristin, and David Bordwell. Film History, An Introduction. New York: McGraw-Hill Humanities/Social Sciences/Languages, 2010. 624. Print.

References

External links 
Official Website
 
Santosh Sivan on low budget filmmaking
How John Malkovich God-Fathered Sivan's The Terrorist
Interim Report of the Jain Commission of Inquiry into the Assassination of Shri Rajiv Gandhi

1998 films
Films about terrorism in India
Works about the assassination of Rajiv Gandhi
1990s Tamil-language films
Films whose editor won the Best Film Editing National Award
Best Tamil Feature Film National Film Award winners
Films directed by Santosh Sivan
Indian Peace Keeping Force